Mer Beel is a lake located in Nagaon district of Assam.

Area 
Total area of this lake is 25 ha.

See also
List of lakes of Assam

References

Lakes of Assam
Nagaon district